Lonchophylla fornicata is a species of bat found in South America.

Taxonomy
Lonchophylla fornicata was described as a new species in 2007 by Neal Woodman. Woodman suggested the common name of "Pacific forest long-tongued bat". The species name fornicata is from Latin meaning "arched"; the name was chosen to allude to its similarity to another species, Lonchophylla concava.

Description

Range and habitat
It is native to South America where its range includes Colombia and Ecuador. As of 2019, it has only been observed in humid forests on the Pacific-facing slopes of the Andes.

Conservation
As of 2019, it is listed as a data deficient species by the IUCN because its ecological requirements are poorly understood.

References

Lonchophylla
Bats of South America
Mammals described in 2007